Statistics of Japan Soccer League for the 1987–88 season.

First Division

Second Division

First stage

East

West

Second stage

Promotion Group

Relegation Group

East

West

9th-16th Places Playoff

References
Japan - List of final tables (RSSSF)

Japan Soccer League seasons
1987 in Japanese football
1988 in Japanese football
Japan Soccer League